Catherine Inglehearn became the British Ambassador to Guinea in June 2015 and served until 2019.  In March 2020, she became ambassador to Niger, replacing Catherine Evans. She was succeeded by David McIlroy.

References

Ambassadors of the United Kingdom to Guinea
Ambassadors of the United Kingdom to Niger
British women ambassadors
Year of birth missing (living people)
Living people
21st-century British diplomats